Einar Nyheim  (7 August 1929 – 20 February 1986) was a Norwegian industrial worker and politician.

He was born in Lavik to Kåre Nyheim and Ragnhild Haugland. He was elected representative to the Storting for the period 1973–1977 for the Socialist Left Party.

References

1929 births
1986 deaths
People from Høyanger
Socialist Left Party (Norway) politicians
Members of the Storting